Masho Khel or Mashokhel (in Pashto and  Urdu: ماشوخیل)  is a historical village in the capital district Peshawar of province Khyber Pakhtunkhwa in Pakistan. The village is situated about 13km to the south of Peshawar cantonment. Masho Khel is well known for a historic event that took place in 1847, when the people of the village refused to pay revenue to Major George Lawrence of British Raj. The sufi and philosophical poet of the 17th century, Abdul Hamid Baba, was also this village. The spoken language in the village is Pashto and people belong to the Pashtun's tribe Mohmand .

Administrative Division
Masho Khel is a part of Pakistan National Assembly seat NA-29 (Peshawar-II) and Khyber Pakhtunkhwa Assembly seat PK-71 (Peshawar-III). Masho Khel is under police station Badaber. There are two village councils in Masho Khel.  The village falls under the local administration of  union council (UC 58) Sheikhan, Tehsil Pishtakhara.

Education 
The literacy rate in Masho Khel is very low. The major reason is poverty and inaccessibility to schools. Masho Khel has a public high school for boys which along many other schools was bombed by militants. For girls, a public high school has been built recently. There are some private schools as well but students usually go to schools in public Peshawar city and cantonment. A group of volunteers has been helping students under the name Masho Khel Free Education Foundation.

Healthcare
The village has no major hospital and only the Basic Health Unit (BHU) is functional in the village. However, there are few private practitioners in the village. The nearest major hospitals which are about 10km away are the Hayatabad Medical Complex Peshawar, Khyber Teaching Hospital and Lady Reading Hospital.

Famous For
Masho Khel is well known for a historic event that took place in 1847, when the people of the village refused to pay revenue to Major George Lawrence of British Raj. The sufi and philosophical poet of the 17th century, Abdul Hamid Baba, was also from Masho Khel. Masho Khel is also famous spiritual leaders i.e Khudaye Khidmatgar Abdul Subkhan khan ANP, Father Of Hamayoun Khan,  Mian Abdullah Jan, known as Baba G. Baba G was the uncle of Shaheed Mian Mushtaq Ahmad. Shaheed Mian Mushtaq Ahmad was the district president of ANP. There is also a famous singer known as Zahir Masho Khel.

People
People of Masho Khel are mostly farmers and laborers. However, there are also a good number of people working as teachers, civil servants and armed forces personnel.

Major Crops
The main crop farmed in the village is wheat. Other crops include maize, peas, sunflower, garlic and a variety of decoration flowers.

Sports
There are no proper grounds for any sports. However, street cricket and volleyball are widely played sports in the village.

Major Problems
Poverty, education, healthcare, clean water   and electricity load shedding are major issues in the village. The ratio of girls education is very low which could be due to the unavailability of many girls schools in the village. Only recently, first middle and high schools were constructed for girls. Some primary girls schools were bombed by terrorist.

Nearby Villages
Nearby villages are Suleman Khel, Gari Mali Khel, Mushtarzi, Mashogagar, Balarzi and Badaber.

References 

 Villages in Khyber Pakhtunkhwa